Hi-Lite Park was an amusement park in Geelong, Australia, located near Eastern Beach, on the corner of Bellarine Street and Ritchie Boulevard, where the Eastern Beach tram terminus was once situated. The park opened in 1956 and closed c. 1985.

It was a very popular foreshore attraction in Geelong, comparable to Luna Park, Melbourne, but was closed to make way for the new redevelopment of the Eastern Beach precinct in the 1990s.

Ferris wheel
In December 2006, a Ferris wheel, reported to be the largest non-permanent wheel in the southern hemisphere, was erected in the same area in which Hi-Lite Park once stood. The wheel had been renovated by Phoenix Fabrication & Welding of Geelong, which enlarged the gondolas. There were 36 gondolas, each with capacity to seat six people. It had a 50-metre peak clearance and each ride was 10–12 minutes in duration.

It was imported by the Verfurth family, who ran Hi-Lite Amusements, having also operated Hi-Lite Park under the ownership of first-generation showman Emile Francis Verfurth, who resided in Braybrook, Victoria, and evidently moved his carnival to various sites around Victoria.

References

External Images
 Hy-Lite Park 1960
 11064a205ba.aspx View across Geelong's waterfront amusement park, undated
 Only Melbourne

1956 establishments in Australia
1985 disestablishments in Australia
Defunct amusement parks in Australia
Tourist attractions in Geelong
Amusement parks in Victoria (Australia)
Amusement parks opened in 1956
Amusement parks closed in 1985